{{Historical populations
|footnote = Source: Statistics Norway.
|shading = off
|1951|13625 	 	 		 		 		  	  	  	 	  	  	  	  		  	  	  	  	  	
|1961|17755 	 	 		 	 	 	 	 	  	  	  	  	  	  	  	  	  	
|1971|31702 	 	 	 	  	  	  	 	  	    	  	  	  	  	  	
|1981|35977 	 	 	 	 	 	  	  	  	 	  	  	  	  	  	  	  	  	  	 	
|1991|41903 		 	 	  	  	  	  	 	  	  	  	  	  	
|2001|49661 	 	  	  	  	  	  	 	  	  	  	  	  	 	  	  	  	  	  	  	 	  	  	  	  	
|2011|55284 
|2014|59037 		  	
|2021?|63381
|2031?|69296	  	  	  	  	  	  	  	  	  	  	  	
}}

Asker, properly called Askerbygda in Norwegian, is a district and former municipality in Akershus, Norway. From 2020 it is part of the larger administrative municipality Asker, Viken (also known as Greater Asker) in Viken county, together with the traditional Buskerud districts Røyken and Hurum; Asker proper constitutes the northern fourth and is part of the Greater Oslo Region. The administrative centre was the town of Asker, which remains so for the new larger municipality. Asker was established as a parish in the Middle Ages and as a municipality on 1 January 1838.

History

Since the Middle Ages, the Asker parish consisted of the later municipalities Asker and Bærum. In the 19th century Bærum became the Vestre Bærum and Østre Bærum parish, and Asker and Bærum were also established as separate municipalities.

In 2020, Asker municipality merged with Røyken and Hurum to form Asker, Viken, a larger administrative region than traditional/geographical Asker.

 Name 
The municipality (originally the parish) is named after the old Asker farm, since the first church was built here. The name (Old Norse: Askar) is the plural form of ask which means "ash tree".

 Coat-of-arms 
The coat-of-arms is from modern times. They were granted on 7 October 1975. The arms show a green background with three silver-colored tree trunks and are thus canting arms. The trees are ashes, which were cropped every year to provide food for the animals. The trees thus developed after many years a very typical shape, which was characteristic for the area.

 Place of the Millennium 
In 1998, just before the millennium, the 'Askerbøringer' (the inhabitants of Asker) elected the beautiful area of Semsvannet including the mountain ridge Skaugumsåsen – to be their Place of the Millennium.

 Geography 
Its main parts are Asker, Gullhella, Vollen, Vettre, Blakstad, Bleiker, Borgen, Drengsrud, Dikemark, Vardåsen, Engelsrud, Holmen, Høn, Hvalstad, Billingstad, Nesøya, Nesbru, and Heggedal. Asker is a coastal place with many beaches, but also contains hills and woods. The district is known for many important businesses. It is also known for gardening. The Skaugum estate, where Crown Prince Haakon of Norway lives with his family, is situated here. The first IKEA store outside of Sweden opened at Slependen in Asker in 1963. There are many hiking/ sightseeing spots around Asker; such as Semsvannet lake and Drengsrud cultural path around the area.

Municipality reform
As part of the municipality reform process instigated by Minister of Local Government Jan Tore Sanner the municipalities of Asker, Hurum and Røyken evaluated if they should merge into a new common municipality during the first half of 2016. A tentative agreement was reached and on 16 June 2016 the Municipal Council of Røyken approved the merger with Asker and Hurum with 24 votes for and 3 against. On 14 June 2016 the Municipal Council of Asker also approved the merger with 42 votes for and 5 against. A few days later the Municipal Council of Hurum followed suit and approved the merger. The proposed merger date was 1 January 2020 and the new name will be Asker. Asker was merged with the municipalities of Røyken and Hurum as of 1 January 2020.

 Minorities 

 Culture 
Although Asker is principally a rural municipality, the expansion of Oslo has resulted in its becoming an affluent suburb. Thus numerous celebrities now reside in the area. According to SSB (Statistics Norway), Asker ranks as the 2nd wealthiest municipality in Norway based on median household income.

 Sports 
Asker is also the home of sports club IF Frisk Asker; the club won the Norwegian Hockey championship in 1975, 1979, 2002 and 2019. Asker Skiklubb is the largest sports club in Norway. It has a long history dating back to 1889. Many of Asker's famous people have been successful individuals associated with the sports club.

The city is the home of Asker svømmeklubb. Asker women's football club has been home to many international players including four who played in the 2007 FIFA Women's World Cup in China.

 Politics 
Asker is politically dominated by the conservatives, and the mayor is Lene Conradi who represents the Conservative Party of Norway (Høyre).

Church

Asker Church (Asker Kirke) is located not far from Skaugum in Asker. The neo-Gothic red brick church was built during 1879 based upon designs by architect Jacob Wilhelm Nordan. The church renovation in 1930 was led by the architects Gudolf Blakstad and Herman Munthe-Kaas. Architect Arnstein Arneberg was in charge of the renovation in the 1950s. The church was the sight of the wedding of Princess Ragnhild and Erling Lorentzen in 1953. The statue of Crown Princess Märtha in front of the church was designed by sculptor Dyre Vaa in 1957.

 Maud 

In 1916 (or 1917) the Arctic expedition ship Maud was built in nearby Vollen and launched into Oslofjord. The ship was designed and built especially for Roald Amundsen and sailed through the Northeast Passage between 1918 and 1924. Sold to the Hudson's Bay Company as the supply vessel Baymaud she sank at Cambridge Bay, Northwest Territories (now Nunavut), Canada in 1930. In 1990, the ship was sold by the Hudson's Bay Company to Asker town with the expectation that she would be returned there; however the export permit expired due to the 230 million kroner cost to repair and move the ship. In 2011 a new project was commenced to salvage Maud and transport her to a new museum to be built at Vollen.

On 31 July 2016 it was reported that the hull of Maud had been raised to the surface and placed on a barge in preparation for shipment to Norway. In August 2017 Maud began the journey back to Norway; she was towed through the Northwest Passage. In September 2017 she arrived in Greenland to stay for the winter.Cambridge Bay prepares to bid adieu to the Maud as Norwegian mayor visits community Maud arrived in Bergen on 6 August 2018, finally returning to Norway nearly a century after her departure with Amundsen. She was then towed along the Norwegian coast, and arrived at Vollen on 18 August.

 Media 
 Magazines Development Today''

Notable residents

Royalty 
 Haakon, Crown Prince of Norway (born 1973) the family lives in Skaugum
 Mette-Marit, Crown Princess of Norway (born 1973) 
 Princess Ingrid Alexandra of Norway (born 2004) 
 Prince Sverre Magnus of Norway (born 2005)

Public service 

 Einar Gerhardsen (1897 in Asker – 1987) Prime Minister of Norway 1940s to 1960s
 Dagny Berger (1903 in Asker – 1950) Norway's first woman aviator
 Anders Lange (1904 in Nordstrand – 1974), politician, founded the Progress Party (Norway)
 Arne Skaare (1907-1981) politician, Mayor of Asker municipality from 1956 to 1967
 Jens Evensen (1917–2004 in Asker), Norwegian lawyer, judge, politician, member of the International Law Commission and judge at the International Court of Justice in The Hague
 Hans Christen Mamen (1919 in Asker – 2009) a resistance member, local historian and priest
 Sverre Bergh (1920 in Asker – 2006) an engineer and spy in Nazi Germany during WWII
 Erik Gjems-Onstad, MBE (1922–2011) resistance member and lawyer; lived in Hvalstad
 Jon Fossum (1923 in Hvalstad – 2007) orienteer and Mayor of Asker municipality 1968/80
 Berit Ås (born 1928) former Asker councillor, psychologist and feminist
 Jan Martin Larsen (born 1938) cartographer, orienteer and Asker councillor 1995 to 2007
 Eyvind W. Wang (born 1942) politician, Mayor of Asker 1980 to 1995 and car mechanic
 Morten Strand (born 1947) politician, Mayor of Asker 1995 to 2007 and footballer
 Valgerd Svarstad Haugland (born 1956) politician, county Governor of Oslo and Akershus 2011/18
 Beate Gangås (born 1963 in Asker) LGBT Oslo Chief of Police

Art 

 Axel Ender (1853 in Asker - 1920) a Norwegian genre painter and sculptor 
 Hulda Garborg (1862–1934) playwright, poet and folk dancer; lived in Hvalstad from 1897
 Nini Roll Anker (1873–1942 in Asker) writer, lived in Lillehaugen
 Christian Hartmann (1910 in Asker – 1985) a Norwegian composer
 Alf Prøysen (1914–1970), singer, songwriter and writer; lived in Semsvannet in his youth
 Grete Nordrå (1924 in Asker – 2012) a Norwegian screen actress 
 Erik Bye (1926–2004), journalist, singer, TV personality; lived in Hvalstad
 Tom Tellefsen (1931 in Asker – 2012) a Norwegian actor 
 Arild Nyquist (1938–2004), poet, painter and singer/songwriter; grew up on Røa
 Wenche Myhre (born 1947 in Kjelsås) singer 
 Espen Rud (born 1948 in Asker) a jazz drummer, composer and music arranger
 Brit Elisabeth Haagensli (born 1953) an actress and singer, grew up in Asker 
 Jan Knudsen (born 1957) crime writer, grew up in Asker
 Morten Harket (born 1959) singer in a-ha, grew up in Asker
 Vigdis Hjorth (born 1959) author, lives in Asker
 Kåre Conradi (born 1972 in Asker) a Norwegian actor 
 Svein Magnus Furu (born 1983 in Asker) jazz saxophonist, composer and music journalist
 Nina Fjalestad (born 1993 in Asker) a model, dancer and Miss Globe International 2011
 Vilde Marie Zeiner (born 1999 in Asker) a Norwegian actress

Sport 

 Johan Ferner (1927 in Asker – 2015) sailor, team silver medallist 1952 Summer Olympics
 Harald Stenvaag (born 1953) rifle shooter, two Olympic medals, runs a shop in Asker
 Linda Medalen (born 1965) former footballer with 152 caps with Norway women, police officer and local councillor
 Halvard Hanevold (1969 in Asker – 2019) biathlete, multiple Olympic Gold medallist
 Jan Frode Andersen (born 1972 in Asker) a Norwegian former tennis player
 Pål Arne Fagernes (1974 in Asker – 2003), Javelin thrower and boxer
 Tone Gunn Frustøl (born 1975 in Asker) former footballer, with 32 caps for Norway women and Olympic medalist.
 Tom Hilde (born 1987 in Asker) ski jumper, bronze medallist at the 2010 Winter Olympics
 Erik Follestad Johansen (born 1989 in Asker) former ice hockey player
 twins Harald Østberg Amundsen & Hedda Østberg Amundsen (born 1998 in Asker) cross-country skiers
 Sander Berge (born 1998 in Asker) footballer
 Oskar Spiten-Nysæter (born 2007 in Asker) footballer
 Tanjim Mishkat (born 2007 in Dhaka) footballer

Twin towns

Asker is twinned with:
 Eslöv, Sweden
 Garðabær, Iceland
 Jakobstad, Finland 
 Mapo (Seoul), South Korea
 Rudersdal, Denmark

References

External links 

 Municipal fact sheet from Statistics Norway
 
  
 / Asker sentrum
 Asker Museum 
 Asker public library
 Asker skiklubb 
 Visit Asker – official website and visitors guide for Asker
 Frisk Asker Tigers 
 Budstikka (local newspaper for Asker and Bærum) 
 Asker videregående skole (School for Upper Secondary Education) 
 The Open University in Asker (Folkeuniversitetet) 
 Church of Asker 
 Asker Svømmeklubb 

 
Former municipalities of Norway
Municipalities of Akershus
Villages in Viken (county)
Villages in Akershus
Villages in Asker
Villages in Northern Asker